Miss World Puerto Rico 2008, The annual competition was held in Puerto Rico, televised live by Telemundo Puerto Rico. Miss World Puerto Rico 2007, Jennifer Guevara Campos of Orocovis was succeeded by Ivonne Orsini, from San Juan who won the Miss World Puerto Rico 2008 title on March 27, 2008. Orsini represented Puerto Rico at the Miss World 2008 contest.

Final Competition

Awards
The winners from these categories advanced as semi-finalist.
Award for Best in Sports:  Aguas Buenas - Ingrid Fernández
Award for Best Body:  Juncos - Miriam Pabón
Award for Top Model:  Guaynabo - Melissa Cabral
Award for Best Talent:  Villalba - Leiry Marie Ruiz
Award for Makeup competition:  San Juan - Ivonne Orsini

Contestants

 Aguas Buenas - Ingrid Fernandez

 Barceloneta - Dayana Diaz

 Bayamón - Cristina Jirminian

 Cabo Rojo - Melenie Alemany

 Caguas - Leslian Nieves

 Canóvanas - Nicole Rodriguez

 Carolina - Paulette Lugo

 Cayey - Ismarie Rivera

 Cidra - Nicole Malave

 Coamo - Mariely Rivera

 Comerío - Yashira Ayala

 Dorado - Karim Morales

 Fajardo - Giovanna Morales

 Guayanilla - Jennifer Soto

 Guaynabo - Melissa Cabral

 Isabela - Letty Perez

 Juana Díaz - Arlene Morales

 Juncos - Miriam Pabon

 Lajas - Lizmarie Nazario

 Loíza - Luciandra Santana

 Mayagüez - Samaris Ortiz

 Morovis - Maribel Montalvo

 Naranjito - Yarimar Marrero

 Orocovis - Soleil Vargas

 Peñuelas - Christina Rodriguez

 Ponce - Gisela Rodriguez

 Río Grande - Gloriliz Rodriguez

 San Juan - Ivonne Orsini

 Toa Alta - Karem Negron

 Toa Baja - Shannei Dilbert

 Utuado - Zoraida Figueroa

 Vega Baja - Raquel Galbis

 Villalba - Leiry Marie Ruiz

 Yauco - Giselle Lopez

Notes
Maribel Montalvo (Morovis) previously placed 3rd Runner-up at the Miss Puerto Rico Universe 2008 pageant.
Miriam Pabon (Juncos) later became Miss Puerto Rico International 2008 and Miss Puerto Rico America 2010.

References

2008
2008 in Puerto Rico
Beauty pageants in Puerto Rico
2008 beauty pageants
Miss Puerto Rico